Greatest Hits: From the Beginning may refer to:

 Greatest Hits: From the Beginning (Travis Tritt album)
 Greatest Hits: From the Beginning (The Miracles album)